The 1981 Connecticut Huskies football team represented the University of Connecticut in the 1981 NCAA Division I-AA football season.  The Huskies were led by fifth year head coach Walt Nadzak, and completed the season with a record of 4–7.

Schedule

References

Connecticut
UConn Huskies football seasons
Connecticut Huskies football